Knot theory is the study of mathematical knots. While inspired by knots which appear in daily life in shoelaces and rope, a mathematician's knot differs in that the ends are joined together so that it cannot be undone.  In precise mathematical language, a knot is an embedding of a circle in 3-dimensional Euclidean space, R3.  Two mathematical knots are equivalent if one can be transformed into the other via a deformation of R3 upon itself (known as an ambient isotopy); these transformations correspond to manipulations of a knotted string that do not involve cutting the string or passing the string through itself.

History

Knots, links, braids
 Knot (mathematics) gives a general introduction to the concept of a knot.
 Two classes of knots: torus knots and pretzel knots
 Cinquefoil knot also known as a (5, 2) torus knot.
 Figure-eight knot (mathematics) the only 4-crossing knot
 Granny knot (mathematics) and Square knot (mathematics) are a connected sum of two Trefoil knots
 Perko pair, two entries in a knot table that were later shown to be identical.
 Stevedore knot (mathematics), a prime knot with crossing number 6
 Three-twist knot is the twist knot with three-half twists, also known as the 52 knot.
 Trefoil knot A knot with crossing number 3
 Unknot
 Knot complement, a compact 3 manifold obtained by removing an open neighborhood of a proper embedding of a tame knot from the 3-sphere.
 Knots and graphs general introduction to knots with mention of Reidemeister moves

Notation used in knot theory:
 Conway notation
 Dowker–Thistlethwaite notation (DT notation)
 Gauss code (see also Gauss diagrams)
 continued fraction regular form

General knot types
 2-bridge knot
 Alternating knot; a knot that can be represented by an alternating diagram (i.e. the crossing alternate over and under as one traverses the knot).
 Berge knot a class of knots related to Lens space surgeries and defined in terms of their properties with respect to a genus 2 Heegaard surface.
 Cable knot, see Satellite knot  
 Chiral knot is knot which is not equivalent to its mirror image.
 Double torus knot, a knot that can be embedded in a double torus (a genus 2 surface).
 Fibered knot
 Framed knot
 Invertible knot
 Prime knot
 Legendrian knot are knots embedded in  tangent to the standard contact structure.
 Lissajous knot
 Ribbon knot
 Satellite knot
 Slice knot
 Torus knot
 Transverse knot
 Twist knot
 Virtual knot
 welded knot
 Wild knot

Links
 Borromean rings, the simplest Brunnian link
 Brunnian link, a set of links which become trivial if one loop is removed
 Hopf link, the simplest non-trivial link
 Solomon's knot, a two-ring link with four crossings.
 Whitehead link, a twisted loop linked with an untwisted loop.
 Unlink

General types of links:
 Algebraic link
 Hyperbolic link
 Pretzel link
 Split link
 String link

Tangles
 Tangle (mathematics)
 Algebraic tangle  
 Tangle diagram
 Tangle product
 Tangle rotation
 Tangle sum
 Inverse of a tangle
 Rational tangle
 Tangle denominator closure
 Tangle numerator closure
 Reciprocal tangle

Braids
 Braid theory
 Braid group

Operations
 Band sum
 Flype
 Fox n-coloring
 Tricolorability
 Knot sum
 Reidemeister move

Elementary treatment using polygonal curves 
 elementary move (R1 move, R2 move, R3 move)
 R-equivalent
 delta-equivalent

Invariants and properties
 Knot invariant   is an invariant defined on knots which is invariant under ambient isotopies of the knot.
 Finite type invariant   is a knot invariant that can be extended to an invariant of certain singular knots
 Knot polynomial  is a knot invariant in the form of a polynomial whose coefficients encode some of the properties of a given knot.
 Alexander polynomial and the associated Alexander matrix; The first knot polynomial (1923). Sometimes called the Alexander–Conway polynomial
 Bracket polynomial is a polynomial invariant of framed links. Related to the Jones polynomial. Also known as the Kauffman bracket.
 Conway polynomial uses Skein relations.
 Homfly polynomial or HOMFLYPT polynomial.
 Jones polynomial assigns a Laurent polynomial in the variable t1/2 to the knot or link.
 Kauffman polynomial is a 2-variable knot polynomial due to Louis Kauffman.
 Arf invariant of a knot
 Average crossing number
 Bridge number
 Crosscap number
 Crossing number
 Hyperbolic volume
 Kontsevich invariant
 Linking number
 Milnor invariants
 Racks and quandles and Biquandle
 Ropelength
 Seifert surface
 Self-linking number
 Signature of a knot
 Skein relation
 Slice genus
 Tunnel number, the number of arcs that must be added to make the knot complement a handlebody
 Writhe

Mathematical problems
 Berge conjecture  
 Birman–Wenzl algebra  
 Clasper (mathematics)  
 Eilenberg–Mazur swindle  
 Fáry–Milnor theorem  
 Gordon–Luecke theorem  
 Khovanov homology  
 Knot group  
 Knot tabulation  
 Knotless embedding  
 Linkless embedding  
 Link concordance  
 Link group  
 Link (knot theory)  
 Milnor conjecture (topology)  
 Milnor map  
 Möbius energy
 Mutation (knot theory)
 Physical knot theory
 Planar algebra
 Smith conjecture
 Tait conjectures
 Temperley–Lieb algebra
 Thurston–Bennequin number
 Tricolorability
 Unknotting number
 Unknotting problem
 Volume conjecture

Theorems 
 Schubert's theorem
 Conway's theorem
 Alexander's theorem

Lists
 List of mathematical knots and links
 List of prime knots

Knot theory
Knot theory
Knot theory
Knot theory